Khesanio Hall (born 10 October 1994) is a Jamaican footballer.

Early and personal life
Hall was born on 10 October 1994 in Jamaica; he has two siblings.

Career

Youth and college
Hall played for St. Elizabeth Technical High School in Jamaica, graduating in 2013.  He was named MVP and leading goal scorer of the DaCosta Cup of the Jamaican Schoolboy Football League. He started his college career the United States at Oklahoma Wesleyan University in 2014, transferred to Northeastern University in 2015, graduating in 2018.  He returned to Oklahoma Wesleyan University in 2019 for his final year of eligibility, earning Player of the Week three times, KCAC Offensive Player of the Year, KCAC First Team, and NAIA First Team All American.

Senior
While also still attending college he played in the Premier Development League for the Ocean City Nor'easters, scoring 9 goals in 13 appearances in the 2015 season and was named Nor'easters' Offensive Player of the Year and to the PDL Eastern Conference Team.  Between graduating Northeastern University and starting graduate school back at Oklahoma Wesleyan University, he played in the USL League Two for GPS Portland Phoenix, where he was a goal leader for the 2018 season.

In April 2021, Hall joined National Independent Soccer Association side Stumptown AC ahead of the spring 2021 season. He went on to make four appearances with the team, including two in the Legend's Cup, before departing in July following the conclusion of the season.

International
Hall made his senior international debut for Jamaica in 2013.

References

1994 births
Living people
Jamaican footballers
Jamaica international footballers
Ocean City Nor'easters players
USL League Two players
Association football forwards
Jamaican expatriate footballers
Jamaican expatriate sportspeople in the United States
Expatriate soccer players in the United States
Seacoast United Phantoms players
GPS Portland Phoenix players
College men's soccer coaches in the United States
Oklahoma Wesleyan Eagles soccer players
Northeastern Huskies men's soccer players
People from Saint Elizabeth Parish
Stumptown AC players
National Independent Soccer Association players